The McCarty Glacier is a tidewater glacier located in the Harding Icefield in the Kenai Mountains of the Kenai Peninsula, Alaska.

The glacier is named for William McCarty, a former resident of Seward.

The glacier has been severely affected by global warming and since the early 1900s its terminus has receded 15 km from the mouth of the bay.

See also
List of glaciers and icefields

References

External links
 
 Photo gallery including many pictures of the McCarty Glacier
 Excerpt from an article of the Geographical Review on the McCarty Glacier

Glaciers of Alaska
Glaciers of Kenai Peninsula Borough, Alaska